Desná is a town in Jablonec nad Nisou District in the Liberec Region of the Czech Republic. It has about 3,100 inhabitants.

Administrative parts
Desná consists of administrative parts Desná I, Desná II and Desná III.

Geography
It lies in the Jizera Mountains. The town is situated at the confluence of the rivers Černá Desná and Bílá Desná, which forms the Desná River. The Souš Reservoir, built on the Černá Desná River, is located in the northern part of the municipal territory.

History
Desná was founded by count Maximilian Desfours II in 1691. Its name supposed to be Desfoursdorf, however the simplified name Dessensdorf was adopted. After almost 250 years, its Czech name Desná was derived. In 1913, Desná was promoted to a market town. In 1949, eleven hamlets or their parts was joined to Desná and the municipality was established in its current form. In 1968, it became a town.

Demographics

Transport

České dráhy L1 line runs from Liberec to Szklarska Poręba via the town.

Sport
The town is home to the amateur football club TJ Desná.

Sights
The landmark of the town is the Church of the Assumption of the Virgin Mary. It was built in the neo-Gothic style in 1903.

Notable people
Tomáš Goder (born 1974), ski jumper

Twin towns – sister cities

Desná is twinned with:
 Malschwitz, Germany
 Podgórzyn, Poland

References

External links

Cities and towns in the Czech Republic
Populated places in Jablonec nad Nisou District